The Kate Sharpley Library (or KSL) is a library dedicated to anarchist texts and history. Started in 1979 and reorganized in 1991, it currently holds around ten thousand English language volumes, pamphlets and periodicals.


Namesake
The Kate Sharpley Library was named after a Deptford-born World War I anarchist and anti-war activist. She worked in a munitions factory and was active in the shop stewards movement. Her brother William Sharpley and her father were killed in action and her boyfriend was listed as missing believed killed (though she suspected he had been shot for mutiny). At the age of 22, when called to receive her family's medals from Queen Mary she threw the medals back at the Queen, saying "if you like them so much you can have them".

The Queen's face was scratched, Kate Sharpley was beaten by police, and imprisoned for a few days, though no charges were brought against her. She did however lose her job. After marrying in 1922, she dropped out of anarchist activities until a chance encounter with Albert Meltzer at a train station during an anti-fascist action. This led to her meeting many younger activists and so, when Brixton anarchists came to name the archives they had collected from the movement, her name was chosen in preference to a more famous one.

Holdings 
The library has texts in English and other languages, near complete collections of several anarchist newspapers, and collections of reports and literature from various anarchist organisations. The library is maintained by donations and money made from sales of pamphlets and other publications. As of 2014 it was receiving one or two in-person visits per month and the bulk of the research requests arrived by email.

Locations
The library was begun in the squatted 121 Centre in Brixton, London in 1979 by a collective which included Albert Meltzer. It had both lending and reference sections. When the centre was raided in 1984, the archive was moved to a different squat for safety.
When the library was moved to the safety of Barry Pateman's home in 1991, the focus shifted towards being a special collection and archive.

After being located in Northampton between 1991 and 1999, the library was moved again, this time to a renovated barn at the home of Barry Pateman and Jessica Moran in California.

Publications
As well as preserving the physical artifacts of anarchist history, the library also publishes books and pamphlets on anarchism and anarchist history, covering many subjects that would otherwise be forgotten. Its activities are recounted in its regular Bulletin, available online and by mail to its financial supporters.

Authors it has published or re-published include Miguel Garcia, Albert Meltzer, David Nicoll, Abel Paz, Antonio Téllez, and Bartolomeo Vanzetti.

See also
List of anarchist organizations

References

External links
The Kate Sharpley Library homepage
The Kate Sharpley Library Wiki
Video interview with Barry Pateman, of the Kate Sharpley Library. (2007)
"Interview with Barry Pateman", "Jonathan", YouTube, 12 May 2009.
“Anarchism and Anarchy: A Historical Perspective” Barry Pateman at the 2009 NAASN Conference 
An Interview with Three Members of the Kate Sharpley Library
Barry Pateman, Then and Now: Thoughts on Anarchism (Santa Cruz at the Anarchist Cafe on January 6th 2007)
The Kate Sharpley Library Then, Now and Next: An Interview with Barry Pateman

Anarchist organizations in the United States
Organizations established in 1979
Anarchist bookstores
Libraries established in 1979